Bullock Hill is a mountain located in the Catskill Mountains of New York state, west-northwest of Walton. Walton Mountain is located east-southeast of Bullock Hill, Carroll Hill is located west-southwest of it, Couse Hill is located to the north, and Loomis Mountain is located northeast of Bullock Hill.

References

Mountains of Delaware County, New York
Mountains of New York (state)